Inspector Vargas (Italian: L'ispettore Vargas, Spanish: El inspector Vargas) is a 1940 Italian-Spanish crime film directed by Gianni Franciolini and Félix Aguilera and starring Giulio Donadio, Olga Solbelli and Mariella Lotti.

It was made at Cinecittà in Rome, and released in separate Italian and Spanish versions. The film's sets were designed by the art director Salvo D'Angelo.

Cast
 Giulio Donadio as Ispettore Vargas
 Olga Solbelli as Signora Douwe, sua ex moglie
 Mariella Lotti as Irene, sua figlia
 Lauro Gazzolo as Dedè, il landrucolo
 Checco Rissone as Roulis
 Luis Hurtado as L'industriale Donald
 Massimo Serato 
 Maria Dominiani 
 Miguel del Castillo
 Armando Migliari 
 Lina Bacci 
 Bella Starace Sainati 
 Fernando Aguirre 
 Armando Calvo 
 Juan Calvo 
 Nicolás D. Perchicot
 Carlo Mariotti 
 Gianni Lorenzon 
 Silvana Jerussi 
 Armando Furlai 
 Anna Canonico

References

Bibliography
 Matilde Hochkofler. Anna Magnani. Gremese Editore, 2001.

External links

Spanish crime films
1940 films
1940s multilingual films
Italian crime films
1940 crime films
1940s Italian-language films
Films directed by Gianni Franciolini
Italian films based on plays
Italian black-and-white films
Italian multilingual films
Cifesa films
Films shot at Cinecittà Studios
Spanish black-and-white films
Spanish multilingual films
1940s Italian films